Renato Longo (born 9 August 1937) is a former cyclo-cross racer from Italy. Longo won the World Cyclo-cross Championships five times in 1959, 1962, 1964, 1965 and 1967 and was the Italian Cyclo-cross champion 12 times.

Biography
Longo competed as a professional from 1960 to 1972 and for most of his career he rode with the Salvarani team of Felice Gimondi. Longo's first wins in the World championships in 1959 and 1962 were obtained after a battle with German Rolf Wolfshohl who won the title ahead of Longo in 1960, 1961 and 1963. In 1964, Wolfshohl focused on road racing and Longo became the master of cyclo-cross until Eric De Vlaeminck arrived – although Longo beat de Vlaeminck for his last world title in 1967.
In total he won more than 230 cyclo-cross races in his professional career.

See also
UCI Hall of Fame

References

1937 births
Living people
People from Vittorio Veneto
Italian male cyclists
Cyclo-cross cyclists
UCI Cyclo-cross World Champions (men)
Cyclists from the Province of Treviso